SARS and cytoplasmic seryl-tRNA synthetase are a human gene and its encoded enzyme product, respectively. SARS belongs to the class II amino-acyl tRNA family and is found in all humans; its encoded enzyme, seryl-tRNA synthetase, is involved in protein translation and is related to several bacterial and yeast counterparts.

Mutations in SARS have been associated with several conditions, including HUPRA syndrome.

Discovery 

Since the 1960s, seryl-tRNA synthetases have been described in various eukaryotic species, in both biochemical and structural analyses. It was not until 1997 that human SARS and its enzyme product were isolated and expressed in Escherichia coli by a team from The European Molecular Biology Laboratory in France.

Gene location 

The human SARS gene is located on the plus strand of chromosome 1, from base pair 109,213,893 to base pair 109,238,182.

Protein 

Seryl-tRNA synthetase is made up of 514 amino acid residues as weighs 58,777 Da. It exists as a homodimer of two identical subunits, with the tRNA molecule binding across the dimer by similarity. It has two distinct domains:

 A catalytic core
 A 3 base pair serine binding N-terminal extension

Function and mechanism 

"SARS" and it’s enzyme product seryl-tRNA synthetase are involved in protein translation; specifically, seryl-tRNA synthetase catalyses the transfer of L-serine to tRNA (Ser). The cytosolic enzyme recognises its cognate tRNA species and binds with a high level of specificity, allowing the accurate interaction between corresponding codons and anticodons on mRNA and tRNA during protein translation.

Mutations 
As with many mutations that affect protein translation, mutations in the SARS gene set have been shown to cause a collection of diseases, such as hyperuricemia, metabolic alkalosis, pulmonary hypertension, and progressive kidney failure in infancy; together, these conditions are known as HUPRA syndrome.

In these cases, the SARS gene (in particular, "SARS2") undergoes a missense mutation, which results in a complete lack of acetylated seryl-tRNA synthetase and a severely reduced amount of non-acetylated enzyme. This results in the ineffective or complete inability of L-serine to be transferred to its cognate tRNA, resulting in incomplete protein translation and folding. The impacts appear to only reach a phenotypic pathology in certain high energy expenditure cells, such as renal cells and lung tissue. It has been suggested that the residual activity of the SARS2 gene allows most other tissues to avoid cytopathic symptoms, however, is unable to protect high-energy requirement cells from damage.

The prevalence of SARS mutations resulting in HUPRA syndrome are incredibly rare, with less than 1 in 1,000,000 babies born with the condition. A Palestinian community in the Greater Jerusalem region appears to have a much higher incidence of the mutation, potentially due to a common ancestor.

References

Further reading